Otilio is a given name. Notable people with the name include:

Otilio Ulate Blanco (1891–1973), President of Costa Rica from 1949 to 1953
Otilio Galíndez, (1935–2009), Venezuelan musician and composer
Otilio Olguín (born 1931), Mexican former swimmer and water polo player, competed in the 1952 Summer Olympics
Otilio Alba Polo (1915–1941), Spanish Catalan politician
Otilio Montaño Sánchez (1887–1917), Zapatista general during the Mexican Revolution
Otilio Warrington, known as Bizcocho (born 1944), comedian

See also
Escuela Preparatoria Tlalpan II "Otilio Montaño", senior high school in San Miguel Topilejo, Tlalpan, Mexico City
Pepe Gotera y Otilio, Spanish comic characters: two bumbling and disastrous workmen
Ottiglio